Community Park is a public park in Ridgefield, Washington, United States. The park features a gazebo, an area for skateboarding, and picnic tables.

References

External links
 

Parks in Clark County, Washington
Ridgefield, Washington